Aleksandar Lukić (born 27 February 2002) is a Serbian footballer who currently plays as a defender for IMT, on loan from Red Star Belgrade.

Career statistics

Club

References

2002 births
Living people
Serbian footballers
Serbia youth international footballers
Association football defenders
Serbian First League players
FK Čukarički players
Red Star Belgrade footballers
RFK Grafičar Beograd players
FK IMT players